Said Sulaymanov (born 22 April 1998) is a Kazakhstani long-distance runner.

In 2019, he competed in the senior men's race at the 2019 IAAF World Cross Country Championships held in Aarhus, Denmark. He finished in 129th place.

References

External links 
 

Living people
1998 births
Place of birth missing (living people)
Kazakhstani male long-distance runners
Kazakhstani male cross country runners